Marwan Ahmed al-Ghafory (born in 1980) is a Yemeni novelist, writer and cardiologist. He has been based in Germany since 2011. He has published many literary books and was awarded Sharjah Prize for Arab Creativity for his poetry work entitled, Layal, (Nights), in 2005. He is known for his political articles.

Early life and education 
Al-Ghafory was born in 1980 in Taiz Governorate. Marwan grew up and studied his basic education in Taiz, Yemen. In 1998 Marwan got a scholarship from the government to pursue higher studies in Egypt. He obtained a bachelor in medicine from Ain Shams University Faculty of Medicine in 2006. Then he received a master in Cardiovascular Medicine from Cairo University in 2009. Marwan left to Germany in 2011 and obtained a certificate of specialization in 2016. He has been working there as cardiologist since then. He also writes in many local and international newspapers.

Publications

Poetry 
 Layal (Nights), 2004

Novels 
 Waiting for the Prophecy of Yathrib, 2006
 Code Blue, 2008
 Al-Khazraji, 2013
 Jada’eel Saada, 2014<ref>{{Cite web |date=13 March 2016 |title=«جدائل صعدة» .. رواية يمنية تحاكي الأوضاع شمال اليمن |trans-title="Jadaeel Sa'ada..A Yemeni novel that simulates the situation in northern Yemen |url=https://web.archive.org/web/20160313041240/http://internationalnewsagency.net/news_details.php?sid=2241 |access-date=10 November 2022 |website=International News Agency |language=ar}}</ref>
 Taghribet Mansour Al-Araj'', 2015.

Awards 

 Sharjah Prize for Arab Creativity for his poetry work, Layal, (Nights), 2005
 Dar Naji Nouman Award for his poetry work, Moden fy Na'al El-Mushah, “Cities in Pedestrian Slippers", 2008

References 

Yemeni novelists
Yemeni writers
Yemeni poets
1980 births
People from Taiz Governorate
Living people
21st-century Yemeni writers
Yemeni expatriates in Germany
21st-century Yemeni poets
Yemeni cardiologists